= Louise Bonadio =

Swiss business lawyer

Louise Bonadio (born 1985) is a business lawyer who co-founded the KBB law firm in 2010, and a publisher who founded the Editions Librisme publishing association in 2005.

== Business/Career ==
=== Publishing ===
In 2005 Bonadio created the Editions Librisme publishing association through which she discovered several talented writers. Editions Librisme was created to promote young talented authors. The association was featured in Swiss and French newspapers for its discoveries. The project, supported by the Loterie Romande, made partnerships with other associations. As a publisher, Louise Bonadio discovered the writer Floriane Olivier who was later awarded with many trophies, among them the prestigious “Prix du jeune écrivain francophone”.

=== Business lawyer ===
Bonadio was admitted to the Geneva bar in 2008, and co-founded the KBB law firm in 2010 together with Klonis. The KBB law firm is specialized in business and tax law for high-end clients. As a lawyer, Louise Bonadio has pleaded several times in front of the Swiss Supreme Court. The Swiss newspapers regularly ask for her legal opinion on tax issues.

== Awards ==
She was appointed Officer of the Légion d'honneur.

== Further References ==
- Des jeunes plumes à la librairie, La Dépêche du Midi, 12.22.05
- On recherche des écrivains en herbe, Tribune de Genève, 02.08.06
- S’improviser jeune auteur, Le Matin Bleu, 02.09.06
