= Editions Librisme =

The Editions Librisme is a publishing association founded in 2005 by Swiss publisher and business lawyer Louise Bonadio.

== About ==
The association specializes in promoting young talented authors.

Supported by the Loterie Romande, it organizes contests whose winners are then published. This way, the association has discovered authors such as Floriane Olivier who was later awarded the prestigious “Prix du jeune écrivain francophone”.

== Bibliography ==
- On recherche des écrivains en herbe, Tribune de Genève, 02.08.06
- S’improviser jeune auteur, Le Matin Bleu, 02.09.06
- Des jeunes plumes à la librairie, La Dépêche du Midi, 12.22.05
